In futurology, political science, and science fiction, a post-work society is a society in which the nature of work has been radically transformed.

Some post-work theorists imagine the complete automation of all jobs, or at least the takeover of all monotonous, repetitive tasks (thus unworthy of humans) by cheaper, faster, more efficient, more reliable and more accurate machines. Additionally, these machines can work in harsher conditions and for longer periods of time without stopping than humans. Other theories of a post-work society focus more on challenging the priority of the work ethic, and on the celebration of nonwork activities.

Near-term practical proposals closely associated with post-work theory include the implementation of a universal basic income, as well as the reduction of the length of a working day and the number of days of a working week. Increased focus on what post-work society would look like has been driven by reports such as one that states 47% of jobs in the United States could be automated. Because of increasing automation and the low price of maintaining an automated workforce compared to one dependent on human labor, it has also been suggested that post-work societies would also be ones of post-scarcity.

Literature 
 Daniel Susskind: WORLD WITHOUT WORK: Technology, Automation, and How We Should Respond, 2020,

See also
 Critique of work
 Four-day workweek
 Humans Need Not Apply
 Post-capitalism
 Refusal of work
 Tang ping ("lying flat")
 Inventing the Future: Postcapitalism and a World Without Work
 The End of Work
 The Future of Work and Death

References

Impact of Automation
Futures studies